The 2005 ICC EAP Cricket Cup was held in Vanuatu between 23 and 29 September 2005 as part of the qualification for the 2011 Cricket World Cup. Six teams from the East Asia-Pacific Region competed in a round-robin stage, followed by ranking finals. Japan defeated the Cook Islands in a close final held at Club Hippique in Port Vila, Vanuatu. Both finalists qualified for the 2006 ICC EAP Cricket Trophy; the other four teams had their World Cup hopes dashed six years before the final competition.

Matches

Group stage

Finals

5th/6th Place Playoff

 Samoa vs Indonesia at Independence Park - 29 September 2005

Samoa 71 all out lost to Indonesia 72/3 (23 overs) by 7 wickets.

3rd/4th Place Playoff

 Tonga vs Vanuatu at KaZaa Field - 29 September 2005

Tonga 105 all out lost to Vanuatu 106-4 (34 overs) by 6 wickets.

Final

 Japan vs Cook Islands at Club Hippique - 29 September 2005

Japan 161 all out (48 overs) beat Cook Islands 155 all out by 6 runs.

See also 
International Cricket Council

External links 
ICC EAP Cricket Cup official website

EAP Cricket Cup 2005
ICC EAP Cricket Trophy